Winfield-Hill is a surname. Notable people with the surname include:

 Courtney Winfield-Hill (born 1987), Australian cricketer
 Lauren Winfield-Hill (born 1990), English cricketer

See also
 Winfield Hill

Compound surnames